Rukmani Gounder is a New Zealand economics academic. She is currently a full professor at the Massey University.

Academic career
After a 1994 PhD titled  'An economic analysis of overseas aid motivations : theory and empirical results for Australia'  at the University of Queensland, Gounder moved to the Massey University, rising to full professor.

Selected works 
 Bartleet, Matthew, and Rukmani Gounder. "Energy consumption and economic growth in New Zealand: Results of trivariate and multivariate models." Energy Policy 38, no. 7 (2010): 3508–3517.
 Gounder, R. (2001). Aid-growth nexus: empirical evidence from Fiji. Applied Economics, 33(8), 1009–1019.
 Gounder, Rukmani. "Empirical results of aid motivations: Australia's bilateral aid program." World Development 22, no. 1 (1994): 99–113.
 Saha, Shrabani, Rukmani Gounder, and Jen-Je Su. "The interaction effect of economic freedom and democracy on corruption: A panel cross-country analysis." Economics Letters 105, no. 2 (2009): 173–176.
 Gounder, Rukmani. "Political and economic freedom, fiscal policy, and growth nexus: some empirical results for Fiji." Contemporary Economic Policy 20, no. 3 (2002): 234–245.

References

External links

 

Living people
New Zealand women academics
University of Queensland alumni
Academic staff of the Massey University
New Zealand economists
Place of birth missing (living people)
Year of birth missing (living people)
New Zealand women writers